Calathea is a genus of flowering plants belonging to the family Marantaceae. They are commonly called calatheas or (like their relatives) prayer plants. About 200 species formerly assigned to Calathea are now in the genus Goeppertia. Calathea currently contains around 60 species. Native to the tropical Americas, many of the species are popular as pot plants due to their decorative leaves and, in some species, colorful inflorescences. The young leaves and bracts can retain pools of water called phytotelmata, that provide habitat for many invertebrates.

Description

Foliage 
Calathea leaves are often large and colorfully patterned. The leaves are often variegated with bright colors such as pink, orange, red, and white. The underside of their leaves are frequently purple. During the night, the leaves fold up. In the morning, the leaves unfurl in search of the morning sun. This phenomenon, known as nyctinasty, is made possible by a small joint the plant possesses between the stem and leaf, called a pulvinus.

Flowers 
Calathea flowers can be yellow, purple, and white and bloom in the summer. The flowers have an asymmetrical structure with three petals and three free sepals. Calathea bracts are often more attractive than its flowers.

Species 
The following species are accepted:

Calathea anderssonii H.Kenn.
Calathea anulque H.Kenn.
Calathea asplundii H.Kenn.
Calathea barryi H.Kenn.
Calathea brenesii Standl.
Calathea caesariata H.Kenn.
Calathea calderon-saenzii H.Kenn. & M.Serna
Calathea carlae H.Kenn.
Calathea casupito (Jacq.) G.Mey.
Calathea chiriquensis H.Kenn.
Calathea cofaniorum H.Kenn.
Calathea confusa H.Kenn.
Calathea congesta H.Kenn.
Calathea croatii H.Kenn.
Calathea crotalifera S.Watson
Calathea erythrolepis L.B.Sm. & Idrobo
Calathea fredgandersii H.Kenn.
Calathea fredii H.Kenn.
Calathea galdamesiana H.Kenn. & Rod.Flores
Calathea gentryi H.Kenn.
Calathea grandifolia Lindl.
Calathea guzmanioides L.B.Sm. & Idrobo
Calathea hagbergii H.Kenn.
Calathea harlingii H.Kenn.
Calathea inscripta (W.Bull) N.E.Br.
Calathea ischnosiphonoides H.Kenn.
Calathea jondule H.Kenn. & Hammel
Calathea jerome H.Kenn. 
Calathea lanibracteata H.Kenn.
Calathea lanicaulis H.Kenn.
Calathea louisae 
Calathea lasiostachya Donn.Sm.
Calathea lateralis (Ruiz & Pav.) Lindl.
Calathea latrinotecta H.Kenn.
Calathea lutea (Aubl.) E.Mey. ex Schult.
Calathea marantina (Willd. ex Körn.) K.Koch
Calathea monstera H.Kenn.
Calathea multispicata H.Kenn. & M.Serna
Calathea neillii H.Kenn.
Calathea neurophylla H.Kenn.
Calathea nitens (W.Bull) Ender
Calathea oscariana H.Kenn.
Calathea platystachya Standl. & L.O.Williams
Calathea pluriplicata H.Kenn.
Calathea plurispicata H.Kenn.
Calathea ravenii H.Kenn.
Calathea recurvata H.Kenn.
Calathea retroflexa H.Kenn.
Calathea rubribracteata H.Kenn.
Calathea shishicoensis H.Kenn.
Calathea similis H.Kenn.
Calathea spiralis H.Kenn.
Calathea striata H.Kenn.
Calathea tarrazuensis H.Kenn.
Calathea timothei H.Kenn.
Calathea toroi S.Suárez
Calathea trianae L.B.Sm. & Idrobo
Calathea utilis H.Kenn.
Calathea velutinifolia H.Kenn.
Calathea verruculosa H.Kenn.
Calathea yawankama H.Kenn.

Ecology 
Calathea are native to parts of tropical Latin America and were introduced in Hawaii. The genus is native to the following countries and regions:

 Belize 
 Bolivia
 Brazil
 Colombia
 Costa Rica
 Ecuador
 El Salvador
 French Guiana
 Guatemala
 Guyana
 Honduras
 Jamaica
 Leeward Islands
 Mexico 
 Nicaragua
 Panamá
 Peru
 Puerto Rico
 Suriname
 Trinidad and Tobago
 Venezuela
 Venezuelan Antilles
 Windward Islands

Cultivation 
In ample conditions, calatheas can grow up to three feet in height with wide leaves. Though they are slow growers, once they reach their ultimate height they will stop growing.

Light 
Like the shady floors of the tropical canopies, this genus prefers low to medium light. Too much direct sunlight can damage their fragile leaves. Signs of too much sun exposure may result in sunburn or dullness in the color of the leaves.

Temperature & Humidity 
Along with low to indirect light preferences, these plants require high humidity to mimic their natural habitat . Some calatheas are placed in  bathrooms, kitchens, and other areas with high-moisture levels. Calatheas prefer temperatures 60°F / 15°C and above to support healthy growth. These plants are also sensitive to cold air. The ideal temperatures range for these plants is 75°F / 23°C to 85°F / 29°C.

Water 
Calatheas should be kept moist but not wet. Over or under watering these plants can lead to brown, dry leaves. Calathea are sensitive to minerals found in tap water such as chlorine and fluoride.

Growing medium 
Ideal soil conditions for calatheas should be porous and well draining. Drainage is very important for calatheas due to root rot. A light porous soil and pot with a drainage hole will ensure the plant's delicate root system is not over-watered. Calatheas prefer the soil to be moist but not overwatered. The species also prefers an acidic soil pH.

Cultivars 
The genus Calathea is expansive and is not short of many cultivars. Cultivars include: 
Calathea 'Beauty Star'
Calathea 'Eclipse' 
Calathea 'Freddie'
Calathea 'Indri'
Calathea 'Mia'
Calathea 'Misto'
Calathea 'Zebrina'

Houseplants 
The species was first introduced as a houseplant in the 1970s and 1980s. Over the years, calatheas have become a popular houseplant because of their attractive leaves. Calathea are also grown outdoors in Hawaii and southern Florida. Unlike their wild counterparts, many if not most indoor-kept calathea will not flower.

Propagation 
Plant propagation is the process of creating an offspring of a plant through a mother plant. Calathea achieve propagation through division. To successfully propagate a calathea, one needs to have a healthy established mother plant. After removing the mother plant from its pot, one can gently separate the plant into smaller parts. Once the calathea has been successfully divided, each new grouping must be planted in its own (well-draining) pot. The newly established calathea will soon shoot out new leaves and continue to grow.

Native uses 
In its native range, the large and tough leaves are popular for holding small items. Sometimes, they are used unprocessed, e.g. to wrap fish for transport in parts of Brazil, such as the Benevides region of Pará . In other places, the leaves are used in handicraft to produce containers, such as the quivers of the Nukak people of Colombia . Most famous, perhaps, are the decorative Calathea-leaf rice containers produced in some villages of Thailand, especially in Ban Huak (Amphoe Si Bun Rueang) where they are an important source of income and sold to locals and tourists alike .

Calathea foliage is of importance to some herbivores, such as the caterpillars of the purple owl (Caligo beltrao) which feed on C. zebrina . For a list of Calathea diseases, see List of foliage plant diseases (Marantaceae).

Due to habitat destruction, several species are threatened with extinction .

References 

 
Zingiberales genera